Władysław of Opole may refer to:
Władysław Opolski (1225-1282)
Władysław Opolczyk (1326-1401)